The 2018 South American Trampoline Championships were held in Cochabamba, Bolivia, from December 5 to 10, 2018. The competition was organized by the Bolivian Gymnastics Federation, and approved by the International Gymnastics Federation.

Medalists

References

2018 in gymnastics
Trampoline,2018
International gymnastics competitions hosted by Bolivia
2018 in Bolivian sport